The Indian 5 rupee coin is a denomination of the Indian rupee. The 5 coin was the highest denominated coin until the minting of the 10 in 2005.

Design of the coin
The Lion Capital of Ashoka is minted on the obverse along with the denomination below. In some 5 coins, the denomination alone was minted on the obverse and the Lion Capital minted on the reverse side.

The coins also are minted with the face of Indira Gandhi in her assassination and Jawaharlal Nehru during his 100th birthday anniversary.

Features
 The 5 rupee Indian coin is minted with cupro-Nickel.
 The diameter of the coin is 23mm. 
 The weight of the coin is 5.3 grams.
 The shape is circular.

References

Coins of India
Rupee
Five-base-unit coins